Choquelimpie is a  high volcano in Chile. It is constructed from several separate layers of andesite and dacite on top of Tertiary and Precambrian layers. The volcano was active over six million years ago, with the neighbouring volcano Ajoya active over seven million years ago. Since then, erosion and glacial activity have dramatically reduced the height of the volcano and excavated a central depression.

Choquelimpie is part of one of two belts of volcanically-generated ore deposits. It is mined for silver and gold since Spanish times and a prospect in the 1980s indicated the presence of over eleven tons of ore.

Geography 
Choquelimpie is located in Parinacota province, Arica y Parinacota Region, Chile.

The basement rock surrounding Choquelimpie is mostly of Tertiary age or younger, with the exception of a narrow segment of Precambrian schists. Some of the Tertiary rocks are sediments which accumulated in basins and are of volcanic or biogenic origin. Volcanism in the area started with ignimbrites and now-eroded stratovolcanoes which have been dated at 10 ± 0.6 mya and the 19 mya Condoriri ignimbrite. Local fault zones and lineaments also contribute to the geomorphology.

Geology 
The rim was later breached by Milluni creek. Some hills within the central depression include Cerro Choquelimpie which is the main mining place. Mass failure may have also helped at exposing the buried parts of the volcano.

In order of age, five units have been distinguished. Two subsequent andesite and dacite layers form the bulk of the volcano's flanks. Biotite, hornblende, plagioclase and quartz form most of the phenocrysts in these layers. Five different dacitic lava domes and lava dome like structures are found in the central sector of the volcano including Cerro Chivaque and form the penultimate layer. Finally, andesitic dykes and one dacitic pipe were intruded. Two major regional lineaments have influenced Choquelimpie volcanism. One caldera may be associated with Choquelimpie. Dates obtained from Choquelimpie are over 6.60 ± 0.2 mya old. Choquelimpie's rocks are overall calc-alkaline shoshonite in terms of composition.

Choquelimpie was glaciated during the Pleistocene glaciations, with lateral moraines and cirques well preserved. Three moraine stages have been distinguished, the middle stage of which was attributed to the last glacial maximum although an older age is plausible. Some moraines were overrun by the Parinacota debris avalanche.

Volcanoes surrounding Choquelimpie include Caldera Lauca (10.5 ± 0.3 mya), Ajoya (7.06 ± 0.21 mya), Taapaca, Guallatiri and Parinacota. With decreasing age they are progressively less eroded and less affected by glacial action; Guallatiri is solfatarically active to the present day.

Mining 
A mine is located within the Choquelimpie volcano. Mining has been reported as early as 1643. Before 1980 roughly  gold and  silver were obtained. Estimates made in 1986-1987 indicate the existence of more than 11 million tons of ore. Ore grades estimated are  gold and  silver. Mineralization which formed the Choquelimpie mineral deposits occurred through pulses of hydrothermal processes in acid sulfate environments and subsequent supergene processes. Such processes may now be underway at Guallatiri.

The Choquelimpie mineral deposit belongs to a category of ore deposits in the Andes which forms a long belt of epithermal deposits. Another belt of copper porphyry deposits is also found in the Andes but independent of the epithermal belt. Orcopampa in Peru is another mineral deposit of this epithermal type. The mineral deposits are found within heavily altered breccias and porphyries in the case of Cerro Choquelimpie, with kaolinization and silification predominant. Propylitic modification is also present. The mineralization occurred  beneath the local water table.

Attempts to extract silver from sulfidic waste commenced in 1960 but success only occurred after 1980. The processing first occurred in Arica and later in a plant next to the mine. Acanthite, auripigment, galena, realgar and  sphalerite are among the ores found at Choquelimpie. The surrounding rock contains alunite, barite, calcite, clays, pyrite and quartz. Enargite is also found at Choquelimpie.

The company Norsemont Mining owns the Choquelimpie mine. Previous companies involved in Choquelimpie included the Arica Mining Company. Shell Chile bought Choquelimpie in 1987. The discovery of gold at Choquelimpie in the 1980s, among other deposits, has contributed towards making Chile a major gold province.

References

Sources 
 

Miocene volcanism
Volcanoes of Arica y Parinacota Region
Mining in Chile